Percy Harold Maybury (24 September 1891 – 8 May 1963) was an Australian rules footballer who played in the VFL between 1910 and 1919 for the Richmond Football Club.

Football
In the match against University, at the MCG, on 30 May 1914, Maybury kicked six goals, all of them from place kicks.

He was Captain/Coach of Richmond for the 1917 season.

Notes

References
 Hogan P: The Tigers Of Old, Richmond FC, (Melbourne), 1996.

External links
 
 

1891 births
1963 deaths
Australian rules footballers from Victoria (Australia)
Australian Rules footballers: place kick exponents
Richmond Football Club players
Richmond Football Club coaches
Footscray Football Club (VFA) players